Eupsilia cirripalea, or Franclemont's sallow, is a species of cutworm or dart moth in the family Noctuidae. It is found in North America.

The MONA or Hodges number for Eupsilia cirripalea is 9934.

References

Further reading

 

Eupsilia